Kachugsky District is an administrative district, one of the thirty-three in Irkutsk Oblast, Russia. Municipally, it is incorporated as Kachugsky Municipal District. Its administrative center is the urban locality (a work settlement) of Kachug. Population:  20,501 (2002 Census);  The population of Kachug accounts for 40.3% of the district's total population.

References

Notes

Sources

Districts of Irkutsk Oblast